The Strategic Banking Corporation of Ireland (SBCI) is a National bank that was established in 2015 in the wake of the Irish banking crisis to provide finance for small and medium-sized businesses. At the time it was set up, many of Ireland's main banks were unable or unwilling to provide to businesses. The Strategic Banking Corporation of Ireland does not provide loans directly to businesses themselves, but instead provides finance to the main banks at low cost, with the idea that the money is then loaned on to business. As of 2016, the bank had provided €347m to small businesses. Its Chief executive is June Butler.

References

External links

Government agencies of the Republic of Ireland
Government-owned companies of the Republic of Ireland
Banks established in 2015
2015 establishments in Ireland
Banks of Ireland
Financial services in the Republic of Ireland
Economic history of Ireland
Post-2008 Irish economic downturn